Pir Vahsh (also Romanized as Pīr Vaḩsh; also known as Pīr Vash) is a village in Bagh-e Keshmir Rural District, Salehabad County, Razavi Khorasan Province, Iran. At the 2006 census, its population was 393, in 73 families.

References 

Populated places in   Torbat-e Jam County